The Familiar is the 41st book in the Animorphs series, written by K.A. Applegate.  It is known to have been ghostwritten by Ellen Geroux. It is narrated by Jake.

The cover quote is "They're out of sight. You're out of mind..." The inside cover quote is "All grown up and no place to go..."

Plot summary 
The story opens in the middle of a particularly violent battle. As the battle becomes more and more hopeless Jake orders a desperate retreat leaving Marco and Rachel to fend for themselves. The Animorphs all escape, but barely. Tensions are high and Cassie begins to break down again questioning the violence and killing that come with battle. Jake responds to her without much sympathy.

Exhausted he returns home and Tom seems at last suspicious of him. He falls asleep. When he awakes he realizes that he is a ten years older version of himself living in New York City on an earth that has already been completely taken over by the Yeerks. Everyone assumes him to be a Controller with a Yeerk named Essak in his head. Jake follows the crowd to his work, but skips his stop in order to investigate this strange new world. He doesn't know how he has come to be in this time and place and suspects that it is some kind of alternate or parallel timeline created by the Ellimist or Crayak.

He discovers that there is a terrorist organization called the Evolutionist Front (EF) which is composed of Yeerks and their hosts who believe that forms of biological evolution and mutation should be explored instead of the enslavement of sentient species. He encounters Cassie, who is a Controller and one of the leaders of the organization. She is a brutal and calculating terrorist who will use any tactics to sabotage the Yeerk Empire. She persuades Jake to help her foil a Yeerk plot to turn Earth's Moon into a Kandrona sun, and tells him a contact will approach him with details later.

It seems that time and space do not always follow logically in this futuristic world. Jake travels to his place of work, and there he is haunted by the image of the many creatures he has killed in battle. He is then taken in to be interrogated about EF activities. His questioner is a Controller Marco who is Visser Two, and the leader of Earth. Marco has also captured Cassie and threatens to kill her if Jake does not work with him against the EF.

Jake's EF contact turns out to be an unrecognizable crippled Rachel, scarred from years of battle with a missing arm, eye and both of her legs. She gives him instructions where to meet the head of the resistance, saying that he will recognize him when he sees him. Jake follows her instructions and encounters a fully grown Andalite whom he believes to be Elfangor. It is in fact a cold and indifferent Tobias. Tobias explains that he stayed in morph as Ax, and explains to Jake that his brother Tom killed Jake while he slept ten years ago. He seeks Jake's help in foiling the Yeerk plan for Kandrona on the Moon. Jake protests that this will mean certain death for Cassie and Tobias responds that sacrifices must be made in war.

In a race against time Jake is faced with a choice to either save Cassie or the world. Jake chooses to save "what must be valued above all else". Jake is then instantly back in his bed the next morning. He hears a voice in his head which he has "never heard", saying it is not the Ellimist. He describes the voice as both young and old, male and female, like distant thought speak. The voice simply says "Interesting choice. They have strangely segmented minds: conscious, unconscious, and an ability to reconcile both. They will bear more study, these humans…".

Jake then gets out of bed and calls Cassie to ask her if she's all right.

Morphs

Tobias only morphs in the simulated reality Jake experiences, and thus is not actually trapped in Andalite morph.

Trivia
The voice at the end of the book is likely the entity that created the simulated reality.

Animorphs books
2000 science fiction novels
2000 American novels
Novels set in New York City
Novels set in the future
Dystopian novels
Novels about parallel universes